KRAP (1350 AM) is a radio station licensed to Washington, Missouri.

Station and programming
Originally put on the air by then-owner Ken Kuenzie as KSLQ in 1985, the station changed its callsign to KWMO in July 1998 under the new owner Brad Hildebrand. The station changed its call sign once more on July 28, 2014 to the current KRAP.

KRAP transmits from Warren County about 1 mile (1.6 km) north of the Missouri River and downtown Washington. As a sports station, KRAP featured the CBS Sports Radio Network. KRAP also broadcast local and regional sports play-by-play including St. Louis Blues Hockey, Kansas City Chiefs football as well as high school, college, and minor league sports teams.

On June 24, 2018, KRAP changed formats from sports to hot adult contemporary, branded as "Westplex 107.1" (simulcast on translator K296HA Washington, Missouri).

Call sign meaning
In 2014, the station gave itself the self-aware callsign KRAP, saying on their website: "Our signal is KRAP. Our studios are KRAP. Even our staff is KRAP."

Previous logo

References

External links

RAP
Radio stations established in 1998